Hastur (The Unspeakable One, The King in Yellow, Him Who Is Not to be Named, Assatur, Xastur, H'aaztre, or Kaiwan) is an entity of the Cthulhu Mythos.

Hastur first appeared in Ambrose Bierce's short story "Haïta the Shepherd" (1891) as a benign god of shepherds. Subsequently Robert W. Chambers used the name in his late 1800s stories to represent both a person and a place associated with several stars, including Aldebaran. H. P. Lovecraft was inspired by Chambers's stories and briefly mentioned Hastur in The Whisperer in Darkness (1930). Later writers have also adapted Hastur in a variety of tales.

Appearances

Hastur in the mythos

In Bierce's "Haïta the Shepherd", which appeared in the collection Can Such Things Be?, Hastur is more benevolent than he would later appear in August Derleth's mythos stories. Another story in the same collection ("An Inhabitant of Carcosa") referred to the place "Carcosa" and a person "Hali", names which later authors were to associate with Hastur.

In Chambers' The King in Yellow (1895), a collection of horror stories, Hastur is the name of a potentially supernatural character (in "The Demoiselle D'Ys"), a place (in "The Repairer of Reputations"), and mentioned without explanation in "The Yellow Sign". The latter two stories also mention Carcosa, Hali, Aldebaran, and the Hyades, along with a "Yellow Sign" and a play called The King in Yellow.

H. P. Lovecraft read Chambers' book in early 1927 and was so enchanted by it that he added elements of it to his own creations. There are two places in Lovecraft's own writings in which Hastur is mentioned:

I found myself faced by names and terms that I had heard elsewhere in the most hideous of connections—Yuggoth, Great Cthulhu, Tsathoggua, Yog-Sothoth, R'lyeh, Nyarlathotep, Azathoth, Hastur, Yian, Leng, the Lake of Hali, Bethmoora, the Yellow Sign, L’mur-Kathulos, Bran, and the Magnum Innominandum—and was drawn back through nameless aeons and inconceivable dimensions to worlds of elder, outer entity at which the crazed author of the Necronomicon had only guessed in the vaguest way.

— H. P. Lovecraft, "The Whisperer in Darkness"

It is unclear from this quote if Lovecraft's Hastur is a person, a place, an object (such as the Yellow Sign), or a deity. This ambiguity is recurrent in Lovecraft's descriptions of mythic entities.

Later in the same story, it is described that the Mi-Go have been attacked by followers of Hastur, and Hastur is an enemy of the Outer Ones whom the Mi-Go serve:

Actually, they have never knowingly harmed men, but have often been cruelly wronged and spied upon by our species. There is a whole secret cult of evil men (a man of your mystical erudition will understand me when I link them with Hastur and the Yellow Sign) devoted to the purpose of tracking them down and injuring them on behalf of monstrous powers from other dimensions. It is against these aggressors—not against normal humanity—that the drastic precautions of the Outer Ones are directed.

— H. P. Lovecraft, "The Whisperer in Darkness"

 In "Supernatural Horror In Literature" (written 1926–27, revised 1933, published in The Recluse in 1927), when telling about "The Yellow Sign" by Chambers, H. P. Lovecraft wrote:

...after stumbling queerly upon the hellish and forbidden book of horrors the two learn, among other hideous things which no sane mortal should know, that this talisman is indeed the nameless Yellow Sign handed down from the accursed cult of Hastur—from primordial Carcosa, whereof the volume treats...

 In Chambers' "The Yellow Sign" the only mentioning of Hastur is:

"...We spoke of Hastur and of Cassilda..."

Judging from these two quotes, it is quite possible that H. P. Lovecraft not only recognized Hastur as one of the mythos gods, but even made him so recalling Chambers' book.

Derleth also developed Hastur into a Great Old One, spawn of Yog-Sothoth, the half-brother of Cthulhu, and possibly the Magnum Innominandum. In this incarnation, Hastur has several Avatars:

 The Feaster from Afar: A black, shriveled, flying monstrosity with tentacles tipped with razor-sharp talons that can pierce a victim's skull and siphon out the brain.
 The King in Yellow

Anders Fager's "Collected Swedish Cults" features a Stockholm-based coterie known as "The Carcosa Foundation" that worships Hastur.

Hastur is amorphous, but he is said to appear as a vast, vaguely octopoid being, similar to his half-niece Cthylla. In the mythos, Hastur is presented as having "a strange effect on artists and playwrights".

Other appearances
Hastur has appeared in other media. In the light novel and anime series Haiyore! Nyaruko-san, which is based on the Cthulhu mythos, one of the main characters, Hastua, is a Japanized version of and direct reference to Hastur.

Hastur is the name of a demon in the TV series adaptation of Good Omens, portrayed by Ned Dennehy.

Hastur is the name of a hunter in the video game Identity V who is also known as The Feaster and The King in Yellow.

Hastur is also believed to be the King in Yellow in the video game Vampire Survivors. The player also receives the Yellow Sign from them directly.

The short story "Gramma" by Stephen King features a demonic entity named Hastur, who also appeared in the 18th episode of the 1985 "Twilight Zone" adaptation and the 2014 film adaptation, Mercy.

Though not named directly, The King in Yellow is mentioned and connected to Carcosa in the first season of the HBO series True Detective.

Hastur as The King in Yellow is portrayed in a short film titled "The King In Yellow" by experimental filmmaker Cole Frederick.

In the Doctor Who Virgin New Adventures novel All-Consuming Fire, Hastur the Unspeakable is either one of the names/titles belonging to or the original name of the Great Old One, Fenric.

Hastur appears in the Persona games, as both an enemy and summonable ally.

Hastur, as the King in Yellow, appears in the podcast "Malevolent".

Hastur the Unspeakable, god of shepherds, appears in Jonathan Maberry's Kagen the Damned series as the god of Hakkia and his chief priest the Witch-King, Gethon Heklan, the King in Yellow. The first novel of the series was published in 2022.

Hastur, The King in Yellow, appears as the leader of the 11th dome in the web novel series "Infinite Realm".

See also 
 Cthulhu Mythos in popular culture

References

External links 

 Haïta the Shepherd
 
 

Cthulhu Mythos deities
Fictional amorphous creatures
Fictional monsters
Literary characters introduced in 1893
Male literary villains